Ovarense Basquetebol is a professional basketball team that plays in Ovar, Portugal. The team plays in the LPB. The Ovarense created its section of basketball in 1970, with the initiative of a member entrepreneur, João Gonçalves, but in this period of time managed to assert itself as one of the standards and the inevitable reference method in Portugal.

History
Between 1976–77 and 1978–79, Ovarense ascended from third to first, on the national level, indicating that the team's basketball vocation was strong. The club never fell from its division, and the arrival of two Americans at the end of the 80s gave the team the quality required to raise its level.

Honours
 Liga Portuguesa de Basquetebol: 5
1987–88, 1999–00, 2005–06, 2006–07, 2007–08
 Taça de Portugal: 3
1988–89, 1989–90, 2008–09
 Supertaça de Portugal: 8
1988, 1990, 1993, 2000, 2001, 2006, 2007, 2008
 Taça da Liga/Hugo dos Santos: 3
1991–92, 1996–97, 2000–01
 Troféu António Pratas LPB:2
2009, 2014
 Torneio dos Campeões: 3
2004–05, 2006–07, 2007–08

Notable players

  Mario Elie 
  Nate Johnston 
  Anthony Pullard 
  Jason Sasser 
  Michał Ignerski 
   Greg Butler [unknown number of seasons]

References

External links
 http://www.ovarense.pt// Official site] 
Ovarense – Eurobasket.com

Basketball teams in Portugal